Patricia Galvin (born March 20, 1939) is an American equestrian. She competed at the 1960 Summer Olympics and the 1964 Summer Olympics.

References

External links
 

1939 births
Living people
American female equestrians
American dressage riders
Olympic equestrians of the United States
Equestrians at the 1960 Summer Olympics
Equestrians at the 1964 Summer Olympics
Pan American Games medalists in equestrian
Pan American Games gold medalists for the United States
Pan American Games silver medalists for the United States
Equestrians at the 1959 Pan American Games
Equestrians at the 1963 Pan American Games
Medalists at the 1963 Pan American Games
21st-century American women